Donald George Davis (February 26, 1928 – January 23, 1998) was a Canadian actor.

Career
He was born in Newmarket, Ontario, where his grandfather Elihu James Davis (and his uncle, Aubrey Davis) owned the Davis Leather Company. He attended St. Andrew's College from 1941 to 1946, graduating with the Class of 1946, and studied theatre at the University of Toronto. He performed at the Woodstock Playhouse in New York in 1947. In 1948, with his brother, Murray Edward Davis, he founded a summer theatre company, the Straw Hat Players, at Muskoka, Ontario. Davis performed in Britain from 1950 to 1953. In 1953, with his brother and sister (Barbara Chilcott), he founded the Crest Theatre in Toronto, which operated until 1966. He performed at the Stratford Festival and on radio and television.

He was also a member of the acting company at the American Shakespeare Theatre in Stratford, Connecticut. In 1959, he began performing off-Broadway. He played Krapp in the North American premiere production of Samuel Beckett's Krapp's Last Tape, for which he won an Obie Award.  He performed in regional theatres in Canada and the United States.

Death
Davis died of emphysema at Toronto in 1998 at age 69.  St. Andrew's College opened the Donald Davis Theatre posthumously in his honour.

Selected filmography
 San Diego, I Love You (1944)
 The Return of Rusty (1946)
 Joy in the Morning (1965)

References

External links
 Entry from the Canadian Encyclopedia
 Donald Davis: Canadian Actor, Producer, Director
 "Donald Davis, 69, Actor in Challenging Roles", by Mel Gussow, January 28, 1998 in The New York Times.
 UK National Portrait Gallery
 Goodwin, Jill Tomasson. "A Career in Review: Donald Davis Canadian Actor, Producer, Director." Theatre Research in Canada 10.2 (1989): 132–151.

1928 births
1998 deaths
Canadian male stage actors
Canadian people of British descent
People from Newmarket, Ontario
Male actors from Ontario
20th-century Canadian male actors
Canadian expatriates in England
Canadian expatriate male actors in the United Kingdom
Canadian expatriate male actors in the United States